Solomon Hersh "Paul" Frees (June 22, 1920November 2, 1986) was an American actor, comedian, impressionist, and vaudevillian. He is known for his work on Metro-Goldwyn-Mayer, Walter Lantz, Rankin/Bass, and Walt Disney theatrical cartoons during the Golden Age of Animation and for providing the voice of Boris Badenov in The Rocky and Bullwinkle Show. Voice actor Mel Blanc said Frees was known as "The Man of a Thousand Voices", though the appellation was more commonly bestowed on Blanc himself.

Early life
Solomon Hersh Frees was born to a Jewish family in Chicago, Illinois, on June 22, 1920. He grew up in the Albany Park neighborhood and attended Von Steuben Junior High School. He had an unusually wide four-octave voice range that enabled him to voice a scale from the thundering basso profundo of the unseen "Ghost Host" in the Haunted Mansion attraction at Disneyland in California and at Walt Disney World in Florida to the voice of the farmer who educates the Little Green Sprout (voiced by Ike Eisenmann) about vegetable products of the Jolly Green Giant in the Green Giant vegetable commercials.

Career
In the 1930s, Frees first appeared in vaudeville as an impressionist, under the name Buddy Green. He began his career on radio in 1942 and remained active for more than 40 years. During that time, he was involved in more than 250 films, cartoons, and TV appearances; as was the case for many voice actors of the time, his appearances were often uncredited.

Frees's early radio career was cut short when he was drafted into the United States Army during World War II, where he fought at Normandy, France, on D-Day. He was wounded in action and was returned to the United States for a year of recuperation. He attended the Chouinard Art Institute under the G.I. Bill. When his first wife's health failed, he decided to drop out and return to radio work.

He appeared frequently on Hollywood radio series, including Escape, playing lead roles and alternating with William Conrad as the opening announcer of Suspense in the late 1940s, and parts on Gunsmoke (doing an impersonation of Howard McNear as Doc Adams for at least one episode, "The Cast"), and Crime Classics. One of his few starring roles in this medium was as Jethro Dumont/Green Lama in the 1949 series The Green Lama, as well as a syndicated anthology series The Player, in which Frees narrated and played all the parts.

Frees was often called upon in the 1950s and 1960s to "reloop" the dialogue of other actors, often to correct for foreign accents, lack of English proficiency, or poor line readings by nonprofessionals. These dubs extended from a few lines to entire roles. This can be noticed rather clearly in the films Grand Prix (as Izo Yamura) and Midway, wherein Frees reads for Toshiro Mifune's performances as Admiral Yamamoto; or in the film Some Like It Hot, in which Frees provides the voice of funeral director Mozzarella as well as much of the falsetto voice for Tony Curtis' female character Josephine. Frees also dubbed the entire role of Eddie in the Disney film The Ugly Dachshund, replacing actor Dick Wessel, who had died of a sudden heart attack after completion of principal photography. Frees also dubbed Humphrey Bogart in his final film The Harder They Fall. Bogart was suffering at the time from what was later diagnosed as esophageal cancer, thus could barely be heard in some takes, hence the need for Frees to dub in his voice. He also voiced the cars in the comedy The Great Race.

Unlike many voice actors who did most of their work for one studio, Frees worked extensively with at least nine of the major animation production companies of the 20th century: Walt Disney Productions, Warner Bros. Cartoons, Walter Lantz Productions, UPA, Hanna-Barbera Productions, Filmation, Metro-Goldwyn-Mayer, DePatie-Freleng Enterprises, Jay Ward Productions, Rankin/Bass, and Ruby-Spears.

Disney
Some of Frees' most memorable voices were for various Disney projects. Frees voiced Disney's Professor Ludwig Von Drake in 18 episodes of the Disney anthology television series, beginning with the first episode of the newly renamed Walt Disney's Wonderful World of Color on September 24, 1961. The character also appeared on many Disneyland Records. Von Drake's introductory cartoon, An Adventure in Color, featured "The Spectrum Song", sung by Frees as Von Drake.  A different Frees recording of this song appeared on a children's record, and was later reissued on CD.

In addition to voicing characters, Frees narrated a number of Disney cartoons, including the Disney educational short film Donald Duck in Mathmagic Land. This short originally aired in the same television episode as Von Drake's first appearance.

Frees also provided voices for numerous characters at Disney parks. He voiced the unseen "Ghost Host", or narrator, at both the Haunted Mansion Attraction and Adventure Thru Innerspace (now Star Tours) at Disneyland and Walt Disney World.
For the Pirates of the Caribbean, Frees recorded the ghost voice saying the iconic "Dead Men Tell No Tales" used in the ride, as well as lending his voice to several audio-animatronic pirates, including the Auctioneer, Magistrate Carlos, and the "Pooped Pirate" in the ride. Disney eventually issued limited edition compact discs commemorating the two rides, featuring some outtakes and unused audio tracks by Frees and others. Frees also provided narration for the Tomorrowland attraction Adventure Thru Inner Space (1967–1985) and the original Great Moments with Mr. Lincoln. Audio clips from the attractions in Frees's distinctive voice have even appeared in fireworks shows at Disneyland.

A computer-animated singing bust in Frees's likeness appeared in the 2003 film The Haunted Mansion as a tribute. Similarly, audio recordings of Frees from the Pirates of the Caribbean attraction can be heard in Pirates of the Caribbean: At World's End in an homage to the ride.

Frees also had a small live-action role for Disney in the 1959 film The Shaggy Dog, playing Dr. Galvin, a military psychiatrist who attempts to understand why Mr. Daniels believes a shaggy dog can uncover a spy ring and also spoke the film's opening narration.

His other Disney credits, most of them narration for segments of the Disney anthology television series, include:

 The "Man in Space" series of shows (TV, 1954)
 From Aesop to Hans Christian Andersen (TV, 1955)
 Mars and Beyond (film, 1957)
 The Nine Lives of Elfego Baca (TV miniseries, 1958)
 Tales of Texas John Slaughter (TV miniseries, 1958)
 The Shaggy Dog (film, 1959)
 The Absent-Minded Professor (film, 1961)
 Moochie of Pop Warner Football (TV, 1960)
 The Monkey's Uncle (film, 1965)

For his contributions to the Disney legacy, Frees was honored posthumously as a Disney Legend on October 9, 2006.

Jay Ward Productions
Frees was a regular presence in Jay Ward cartoons, providing the voices of Boris Badenov (from The Rocky and Bullwinkle Show), Inspector Fenwick (from Dudley Do-Right, impersonating Eric Blore), Ape (impersonating Ronald Colman), District Commissioner Alistair and Weevil Plumtree in George of the Jungle, Baron Otto Matic in Tom Slick, Fred in Super Chicken, and the Hoppity Hooper narrator, among numerous others.

Rankin/Bass
Frees is well-remembered for providing the voices for many characters in Rankin/Bass cartoons and stop-motion animated TV specials, most notably for a number of holiday-themed specials. In 1968, he appeared as Captain Jones in the Thanksgiving special The Mouse on the Mayflower, and that Christmas he appeared as the father of the Drummer Boy, Ali, and as the three Wise Men in The Little Drummer Boy. He was also Hocus Pocus, the traffic cop, the ticket-taker, and Santa Claus in Frosty the Snowman in 1969 and played the central villain, Burgermeister Meisterburger, and his assistant Grimsley in Santa Claus Is Comin' to Town in 1970. He provided several voices, including Aeon the Terrible, for Rudolph's Shiny New Year in 1976.

Frees also voiced King Haggard's wizard Mabruk and the Cat in The Last Unicorn and provided several voices for the Jackson Five cartoon series between 1971 and 1973. He provided the voices for several J. R. R. Tolkien characters (most notably the dwarf Bombur) in Rankin/Bass animated versions of The Hobbit and The Return of the King.

Rankin/Bass TV specials or films featuring Paul Frees:

 Cricket on the Hearth (TV special) (1967) Voice of the Sea Captain and others
 The Mouse on the Mayflower (1968) Voice of Captain Jones
 The Little Drummer Boy (1968) Voices of Ali, Aaron's Father, Three Wise Men
 Frosty the Snowman (1969) Voices of Hocus Pocus, Traffic Cop, Ticket Taker, Santa Claus
 The Mad, Mad, Mad Comedians (1970)  Voices of Chico Marx, Zeppo Marx, and W.C Fields (uncredited)
 Santa Claus Is Comin' to Town (1970) Voices of Burgermeister Meisterburger, Grimsley, Topper, Kringle brothers, Sombertown Civilian, Burgermeister's soldiers, Physician
 Here Comes Peter Cottontail (1971) Voices of Colonel Bunny's assistant, Fireman, Man at Thanksgiving Table, Santa Claus
 The First Easter Rabbit (1976) Voices of Santa, Zero, and Spats
 Frosty's Winter Wonderland (1976) Voices of Jack Frost and Traffic Cop
 Rudolph's Shiny New Year (1976) Voices of Santa Claus, General Ticker, Aeon the Terrible, Humpty Dumpty, 1776 (aka Sev)
 The Hobbit (1977) Voices of Bombur and Troll #1
 Nestor, the Long-Eared Christmas Donkey (1977) Voices of Santa Claus, Olaf and Donkey Dealer
 Rudolph and Frosty's Christmas in July (1979) Voices of Jack Frost, Policeman, Winterbolt
 Jack Frost (1979) Voices of Father Winter, Kubla Kraus
 The Return of the King (1980) Voices of Orc, Uruk-hai, Elrond (replacing the deceased Cyril Ritchard who voiced Elrond in The Hobbit)
 The Last Unicorn (1982) Voices of Mabruk and the Cat
 The Flight of Dragons (1982) Voice of Antiquity
 The Legend of Frosty the Snowman (2005) Voice of Hocus Pocus (Archive Recordings)

George Pal
Frees portrayed the Orson Welles sound-alike radio reporter in George Pal's film The War of the Worlds (1953), where he is seen dictating into a tape recorder as the military prepares the atomic bomb for use against the invading Martians. Memorably, his character says the recording is being made "for future history... if any". Frees also provided the film's dramatic opening narration, prior to Sir Cedric Hardwicke's voice-over tour of the solar system.

Frees subsequently provided the apocalyptic voice for the "talking rings" in Pal's later film The Time Machine (1960), in which he explains the ultimate fate of humanity from which the time traveler realizes the origin of the Morlocks and Eloi.

Producer Pal later put Frees to work again in his fantasy film Atlantis, the Lost Continent (also 1960) and doing the opening voice-over narration for Pal's Doc Savage (1975) film.

Frees did the narration for the George Pal documentary The Fantasy Film Worlds of George Pal (1985), written, produced, and directed by Arnold Leibovit. Two years later, Frees provided the voice for Arnie the Dinosaur and the Pillsbury Doughboy in The Puppetoon Movie (1987), also produced and directed by Leibovit.

Other voice work
The talented actor voiced several characters, including three of the main characters in the US versions of Belvision's Hergé's Adventures of Tintin cartoons, based on the books by Hergé.

He had also done work for Hanna-Barbera in their Tom and Jerry shorts at MGM. In the 1956 Cinemascope Tom and Jerry cartoon, Blue Cat Blues, he was Jerry's voice who narrated the short; he had also voiced Jerry's cousin Muscles in Jerry's Cousin five years earlier and the cannibals in the Tom and Jerry episode His Mouse Friday where he said the lines "Mmmmm, barbecued cat!" and "Mmmmm, barbecued mouse!"

At the MGM Animation studio, he also did multiple voice roles for the legendary Tex Avery's films, notably playing every role in Cellbound in 1955.

Frees worked with Spike Jones on his 1960 album "Omnibust", appearing as announcer "Billy Playtex" and several other characters on "The Late Late Late Late Movies, Part I and II".

From October 1961 through September 1962, Paul Frees provided the voice for the shady lawyer named Judge Oliver Wendell Clutch, a weasel on the animated program Calvin and the Colonel starring the voices of Freeman Gosden and Charles Correll, the series was an animated television remake of their radio series Amos 'n Andy.

For the 1962 Christmas special Mister Magoo's Christmas Carol, produced by UPA, Paul Frees voiced several characters, including Fezziwig, the Charity Man, two of the opportunists who steal from the dead man (Eyepatch Man and Tall Tophat Man) and Mister Magoo's Broadway theatre director. He subsequently provided numerous voices for further cartoons in the series that followed, The Famous Adventures of Mr. Magoo.

Frees provided the voices of both John Lennon and George Harrison in the 1965 The Beatles cartoon series, the narrator, Big D and Fluid Man in the 1966 cartoon series, Frankenstein Jr. and The Impossibles and of The Thing in the 1967 series Fantastic Four, as well as President James Norcross in the 1967 cartoon series Super President. He played several rolesnarrator, Chef of State, the judges and the bailiffin the George Lucas / John Korty animated film, Twice Upon a Time.

Frees provided the voice-over for the trailer to the 1971 Clint Eastwood thriller, Play Misty for Me.

In television commercials, he was the voice of the Pillsbury Doughboy, the 7-Up bird Fresh-Up Freddie, Froot Loops spokesbird Toucan Sam (previously voiced by Mel Blanc, later voiced by Maurice LaMarche), Boo-Berry in the series of monster cereal commercials, and The Farmer who helps The Little Green Sprout, (voiced by Ike Eisenmann), who called out to the Jolly Green Giant, "So what's new besides ho-ho-ho, Green Giant?"

Frees narrated many live action films and television series, including Naked City (1958–1963). Frees also provided the voice of the eccentric billionaire John Beresford Tipton, always seated in his chair with his back to the viewer while talking to his employee Michael Anthony (fellow voice-artist Marvin Miller), on the dramatic series The Millionaire.

He was the narrator at the beginning of the film The Disorderly Orderly starring Jerry Lewis. He also "looped" an actor's voice in the film The Ladies Man, also starring Jerry Lewis.

Frees had a wide range of other roles, usually heard but not seen, and frequently without screen credit. The resonance of his natural voice was similar to that of Orson Welles, and he performed a Welles impression several times. Some highlights of his voice work:

 Narrator for The Manchurian Candidate
 Narrated 16 episodes of the NBC science fiction television series Steve Canyon, starring Dean Fredericks (1958–1959)
 Narrated the documentary about J. Robert Oppenheimer, The Day After Trinity (1980)
 The Peter Lorre voice in the 1947 Spike Jones RCA Victor recording of the song "My Old Flame". When talking softly, the voice sounds much like Lorre. When the character segués into a manic rant for a few lines, the voice anticipates the Ludwig Von Drake characterization. Frees appeared on several other Spike Jones recordings including "Pop Corn Sack" also from 1947 in which he provided the voices of Charles Boyer, Edward G. Robinson, Katharine Hepburn and Al Jolson.
 Dialog looping for French actor Jacques Roux, among other uncredited voice work, in the 1963 film The List of Adrian Messenger
 The Orson Welles sound-alike narrator in Stan Freberg Presents The United States of America Vol. 1: The Early Years. When Vol. 2 came out after his death, he was replaced by Corey Burton.
 The voice of Peter Tishman who purchases Manhattan from the Indians on Stan Freberg Presents the United States of America Volume One: The Early Years (sounding very much like Ludwig Von Drake)
 Another Orson Welles sound-alike as the voice of the aliens in Earth vs. the Flying Saucers
 Yet again, as an Orson Welles sound-alike narrator in the 1967 film The St. Valentine's Day Massacre
 Uncredited voice of a reporter trying to get a quote from General George S. Patton in the 1970 film Patton
 Screen credit for multiple voices in the 1971 animated television film The Point!
 Uncredited voice of the sentient supercomputer Colossus in the film Colossus: The Forbin Project
 Narrator of the pre-show for Great Moments with Mr. Lincoln at the Illinois Pavilion of the 1964–1965 New York World's Fair. The exhibit was produced by Disney, and later moved to Disneyland.
 Shrouded figure of "Death" (another near-Welles characterization) in the Woody Allen film Love and Death
 Narration for the spoof short film Hardware Wars (1977), which was styled as a mock film trailer specifically parodying Malachi Throne's narration of the original Star Wars trailer
 Second Voice of KARR in "K.I.T.T. vs. K.A.R.R."a 3rd-season episode of Knight Rider
 Voice of "Josephine" (the female persona of Tony Curtis's character Joe) in the Billy Wilder film Some Like It Hot
 The voice of Dr. Hu in the English-language version of King Kong Escapes
 The voices of "Antoine" and "Alecto" in the English-language version of Atoll K (aka Utopia)
 The voice of the hermit crab "Crusty" in The Incredible Mr. Limpet, a Warner Bros. feature that mixed live action with animation
 Intro voice for Mister Terrific, a sitcom of 17episodes in 1967 with Stephen Strimpell
 Intro voice for Bradbury 13, a series of thirteen radio dramas featuring Ray Bradbury short stories, originally produced for National Public Radio by Michael McDonough at Brigham Young University, 1984
 Credited with singing "Darktown Strutters' Ball" in the 1971 film The Abominable Dr. Phibes (as heard on the film's soundtrack album, along with several other songs performed in character but not used in the film)
 Voice of the title character in the 1957 film The Cyclops
 Narrator of extended "recap" title sequence in early first-season episodes of I Dream of Jeannie in 1965 (and the show's "sponsor I.D." announcer during season one)
 Featured on the 1959 Spike Jones album Spike Jones in Hi-Fi, A Spooktacular in Screaming Sound in recordings "Poisen to Poisen", "My Old Flame", "Everything Happens to Me" and "This is your Death", doing the vocal and voices. "Tammy": vocal by Paul Frees, "Two Heads are Better than One": vocal by George Rock and Paul Frees.
 The uncredited voice of the radio news announcer in the 1964 musical film Robin and the 7 Hoods
 The uncredited English voice of Japanese Admiral Yamamoto in the 1976 film Midway
 Narrator of the documentary The Fantasy Film Worlds of George Pal, in 1985
 Narrator and Voice of Satan (visualized in the film as a snake) in the 1962 film The World's Greatest Sinner

Other credits
Although Frees was primarily known for his voice work (like Mel Blanc, he was known in the industry as "The Man of a Thousand Voices"), he was also a songwriter and screenwriter. His most notable screenwriting work was the little-seen 1960 film The Beatniks, a screed against the then-rising Beat counterculture in the vein of Reefer Madness. In 1992, the film was mocked on an episode of Mystery Science Theater 3000.

On rare occasions, Frees appeared on-camera, usually in minor roles. In 1954, he appeared in the film noir classic Suddenly starring Frank Sinatra and Sterling Hayden.  He played a scientist in The Thing from Another World, a death-row priest in A Place in the Sun, and French fur trader McMasters in The Big Sky. In 1955, he appeared as an irate husband suing his wife (played by Ann Doran) for alimony in an episode of CBS's sitcom The Ray Milland Show; and, in 1957, in an uncredited role as a helicopter pilot in the 1957 science-fiction movie, Beginning of the End.

In Jet Pilot, Frees plays a menacing Soviet officer whose job is to watchdog pilot Janet Leigh, but instead manages to eject himself from a parked jet, enabling Leigh to rescue John Wayne and fly back to the West. In the 1970 film Patton, Frees provided the voices of a war correspondent interviewing Patton while Patton rides his horse, and of a member of Patton's staff, as well as voice-overs for several other actors, including the Moroccan official hosting a troop review for Patton.  Frees is also heard in Tora! Tora! Tora! as the English-language voice of the Japanese ambassador to the United States. He also does the final narration in Beneath the Planet of the Apes, the first sequel to Planet of the Apes.

Legacy
Since Frees's death, voice actor Corey Burton has provided voices for some of Frees's characters. Burton, who met Frees in the late 1970s, has often re-recorded dialogue for some Disneyland attractions originally recorded by Frees. In some cases, Frees's original, pre-digital recordings had simply deteriorated over time, and in others the dialogue had been rewritten to reflect plot changes or introduce new characters, such as the "Stuffed Pirate" replacing Frees's "Pooped Pirate" in the Pirates of the Caribbean ride in 1997. Dialogue that was slightly rewritten to reflect newer safety standards is performed by actors Joe Leahy (English) and Fabio Rodriguez (Spanish). In 2001, Burton provided a Paul Frees impression for the new "Ghost Host" of Haunted Mansion Holiday, a seasonal, holiday-themed overlay for the Haunted Mansion attraction. Burton also recorded Frees's Ghost Host lines for Walt Disney Pictures' 2003 film adaptation of the ride.

Personal life
Frees was married five times. His first marriage was to Anelle McCloud, from 1943 until her death in 1945. He then married Kleda June Hansen in 1947, but they divorced three years later in 1950. His third wife was Joyce Schultz. They married in 1951 and had two childrena son, Fred; and a daughter, Sabrinabefore eventually divorcing. His fourth marriage was to Jeri J. Cole in 1967, but they divorced after just two years, in 1969. Beverly T. Marlow was Frees's fifth wife. They married in 1971 but were estranged at the time of his death fifteen years later.

Death
For the last two years of his life, Frees suffered from multiple ailments, including arthritis, diabetes, and loss of vision, and had mentioned to friends that he was in near constant pain. Frees died at his home in Tiburon, California on November 2, 1986, at the age of 66, from a self-administered overdose of pain medication. Though the official cause of death is listed as suicide, his agent issued a press release stating that he died from heart failure.

Frees was survived by his son and daughter, and by Marlow, who had moved to Mesa, Arizona. His body was cremated and his ashes scattered over the Pacific Ocean.

Filmography

Live-action

Film

Television

Voice roles

Film

Television

Theme parks

Radio

Crew work

References

Further reading
 Frees, Paul, The Writings of Paul Frees (2004) (Albany: BearManor Media) 
 Frees, Paul, You'd Be So Nice To Come Home To: The Letters of Paul "Buddy" Frees and Annelle Frees (2011) (Albany: BearManor Media) .
 Ohmart, Ben, Welcome... Foolish MortalsThe Life & Voices of Paul Frees (2004) (Albany: BearManor Media) 
 Young, Jordan R. (2005) Spike Jones Off the Record: The Man Who Murdered Music (3rd edition) (2005) (Albany: BearManor Media)

External links

 
 
 
 What a Character!
 Voice Chasers "voiceography" 
 Disney Legends profile

1920 births
1986 deaths
1986 suicides
20th-century American comedians
20th-century American male actors
American impressionists (entertainers)
American male comedians
American male radio actors
American male film actors
American male television actors
American male voice actors
American people of Latvian-Jewish descent
Audiobook narrators
Comedians from California
Comedians from Illinois
Disney people
Drug-related suicides in California
Male actors from Chicago
Metro-Goldwyn-Mayer cartoon studio people
People from Tiburon, California
United States Army personnel of World War II
Walter Lantz Productions people
Hanna-Barbera people
Vaudeville performers